Clevedon United Football Club is a football club based in Clevedon, Somerset, England.

History

Clevedon United was formed in the early 1970s as a merger between Clevedon Sports AFC and Tickenham United.

After years in the Somerset County League, they achieved promotion to the Western Football League Division One after a 3rd-place finish in the 2002–03 season. In their four completed seasons in the Western League, they always finished in the middle third of the table, and remained members of Division One until 2010.

Since their move to share Clevedon Town's Hand Stadium, they have become eligible to compete in national competitions — their best performances being a run to the Second Round Qualifying of the FA Cup in 2003–04,  and reaching the Second Round Proper of the FA Vase in 2000–01.

After enjoying spells under the managerial guidance of ex- Bristol City F.C. defender Andrew Llewellyn, and more recently playing duo Adam Tudor and Tony Cook, Clevedon United appointed Mark Selway as manager. Mark Selway works alongside Chris Pimm, Luke Hack and club physio Luke Doran in day by day management. Clevedon United were in 2nd place before the cancellation of the 2020–21 season due to the Coronavirus pandemic.

In 2010 changes in usage charges meant that the team were no longer able to play at the Hand Stadium.

During the Coronavirus pandemic, United won the Somerset Senior cup for the first time in a reformed champions league style format for the competition.

Ground

Clevedon United play their home games at Coleridge Vale, Clevedon, Somerset, BS21 6HG.

Honours

Somerset Senior League
Winners: 1998–99 
Runners Up: 1987–88, 1991–92, 1992–93, 1997–98
Somerset Senior Cup 
Runners Up: 2018
Winners: 2021

RecordsHighest League Position9th in Western League Division One: 2004–05Best FA Cup PerformanceSecond Qualifying Round: 2003–04Best FA Vase Performance'''
Second Round: 2000–01

Notable current & former players

 Jack Butland
 Jantzen Derrick
 Chris Garland
 Cameron Jenkins

References

External links
Club website

Football clubs in England
Football clubs in Somerset
Association football clubs established in 1974
1974 establishments in England
Clevedon
Somerset County League
Western Football League